3C 319 is a radio galaxy located in the constellation Draco.

References

External links
 www.jb.man.ac.uk/atlas/

Quasars
Draco (constellation)